Muhammad Sharif Gulkhani (1770s–1827), better simply known as Gulkhani (also one of his pen names), was a poet and satirist from Kokand. He was bilingual in Persian and Chagatai.

Not much is known about Gulkhani's life. He hailed from a farmer's family; his father's roots reportedly lay in what is present-day central Tajikistan. Gulkhani eventually became part of the retinue of Kokand's ruler Muhammad Umar Khan and his wife, who sponsored arts and culture within the Khanate of Kokand and were poets themselves.

References

Sources

Further reading
 
 

1770s births
1827 deaths
Persian-language poets
People from Kokand
Khanate of Kokand